As of 2022, Hunan hosts 130 institutions of higher education, ranking sixth together with Hubei (130) among all Chinese provinces after Jiangsu (168), Guangdong (160), Henan (156), Shandong (153), and Sichuan (134). Hunan is also the seat of 12 adult higher education institutions. There are three national key universities under Project 985 (Hunan University, Central South University and the National University of Defense Technology) in Hunan, the third-highest after Beijing and Shanghai. Hunan Normal University is the key construction university of the national 211 Project, and Xiangtan University is a key university jointly built by Hunan Province and the Ministry of Education. As of 2022, these five national key universities are included in the Double First-Class Universities of Hunan Province.

References 

List of Higher Education Institutes in Hunan Province—china.org.cn
List of Chinese Higher Education Institutions — Ministry of Education
List of Chinese universities, including official links
Hunan Institutions Admitting International Students

 
Hunan